Michael Fancutt (born 20 February 1961) is a former professional tennis player and coach from Australia. From 1998 to 2004, he coached the University of Tennessee tennis team.

During his career, Fancutt won one doubles title. He achieved a career-high doubles ranking of World No. 36 in 1984.

Career finals

Doubles (1 title, 2 runner-ups)

External links
 
 

Australian male tennis players
Australian Open (tennis) junior champions
Tennis players from Brisbane
Living people
1961 births
Grand Slam (tennis) champions in boys' doubles
Australian people of South African descent